Lead picrate is an organic picrate salt. It is a sensitive and highly explosive compound that is typically found as a hydrate. Dry lead picrate is incredibly dangerous and cannot be handled without explosive decomposition occurring.

History 
Lead picrate was first discovered in the early 1900s. It was investigated by numerous militaries during the First World War as a potential primary explosive, most notably Germany for using it in blasting caps.

Preparation 
Numerous lead precursors can be used to create lead picrate. Two of the simplest examples of lead picrate synthesis are the addition of lead(II) oxide or lead carbonate with picric acid.

References

Picrates
Lead(II) compounds